Pedro de Reina Maldonado (1599 – 9 October 1660) was a Roman Catholic prelate who served as Bishop-Elect of Santiago de Cuba (1659–1660).

Biography
Pedro de Reina Maldonado was born in Lima, Peru in 1599.
On 10 November 1659, he was appointed during the papacy of Pope Alexander VII as Bishop of Santiago de Cuba.
He died before he was consecrated on 9 October 1660.

References

External links and additional sources
 (for Chronology of Bishops)  
 (for Chronology of Bishops) 

17th-century Roman Catholic bishops in Cuba
Bishops appointed by Pope Alexander VII
1599 births
1660 deaths
Roman Catholic bishops of Santiago de Cuba